CNBL may refer to:
Canadian National Basketball League
Christlich-Nationale Bauern- und Landvolkpartei, former German political party
 In genealogical records it is sometimes used for "cannot be learned"